Tribodus is an extinct genus of hybodont shark from the Romualdo Formation of northeastern Brazil. It lived during the Early Cretaceous period (Aptian to Albian stages). This genus is known from articulated and somewhat complete specimens, from a locality known for the extraordinary preservation of the fossil remains found. Tribodus specimens have been preserved three-dimensionally, and acid-preparation methods have revealed much of the anatomy of this shark.Tribodus is found to have dorsal fin-spines and head spines, though only in males.

References 

Hybodontiformes
Prehistoric fish of South America
Early Cretaceous animals of South America
Albian life
Aptian life
Cretaceous Brazil
Fossils of Brazil
Romualdo Formation
Fish described in 1989
Taxa named by Alberto Brito